Bonnie Burstow (March 6, 1945 – January 4, 2020) was a Canadian psychotherapist, author, and anti-psychiatry scholar. She was a professor in the Ontario Institute for Studies in Education (OISE) at the University of Toronto. 

Burstow argued that conditions that the medical profession described as mental illnesses are in fact rational reactions to social, economic and political conditions and that psychiatry is rooted in patriarchy with a tendency to view troubled women as “hysterical” and to overdiagnose their conditions and overmedicate them. Burstow said that in psychiatry's view: “Women are disordered if they acted like women; women are disordered if they didn’t act like women."

In 2003, Burstow founded the Coalition Against Psychiatric Assault, an organization which campaigned to ban electroshock therapy. In 2010, she worked with Ontario New Democratic Party MPP Cheri DiNovo to introduce a private member’s bill to end public funding of electroshock therapy. The bill did not pass the Ontario legislature.

She was born Bonnie Judith Grower  on March 6, 1945, in Winnipeg, Manitoba. Her parents were Sam Grower, an aide to the province's health minister and Dena (Bloomfield) Grower, an economist for Manitoba’s provincial government.

Burstow studied philosophy and English at the University of Manitoba and went on to receive a master's in English from the University of Toronto.
she studied philosophy and English as an undergraduate at the University of Manitoba, received a master’s in English and a masters in education from the University of Toronto. She began practicing as a psychotherapist in 1978 while studying towards a doctorate in educational theory with a psychology minor.

While working with female patients she noted that "A lot of what was causing women these problems was patriarchy, a lot of things that were seen as problematic were reasonable ways for women to cope in a patriarchal, traumatizing world.”

As a result, she began referring to herself as a "feminist therapist" and was drawn to the anti-psychiatry movement. In 1992, she published “Radical Feminist Therapy,” a book that discusses violence against women and responses to it, including depression and eating disorders.

In 2016, the University of Toronto launched the Bonnie Burstow Scholarship in Antipsychiatry, which is awarded annually to students at the OISE conducting research in anti-psychiatry. It is the first anti-psychiatry scholarship in the world, and it provoked a controversy regarding academic freedom after it was announced. The initiative outraged some faculty with University of Toronto psychiatry professor telling the New York Times: 
"They’re trying to claim that there’s no such thing as psychiatric illness, and I think she did a lot of damage with the publicity she got surrounding that,” adding that the university, “made a big mistake in setting up a special scholarship fund in her name; it’s an anti-psychiatry fund that legitimizes the movement.”

In 2019, she gave $25,000 of her own money to create the Bonnie Burstow Scholarship for Research into Anti-Semitism. She wrote several nonfiction books, including Psychiatry And The Business Of Madness (2015), as well as the novels The House On Lippincott (2006) and The Other Mrs. Smith (2017). She also endowed a scholarship for the study of violence against Indigenous women.

Burstow died at the age of 74 on January 4, 2020.

References

External links
Faculty page

1945 births
2020 deaths
Canadian psychotherapists
21st-century Canadian women writers
Writers from Winnipeg
Academic staff of the University of Toronto
University of Manitoba alumni
University of Toronto alumni
Anti-psychiatry
Canadian women novelists
21st-century Canadian novelists
Psychiatric survivor activists
Feminist theorists